The Ministry of Tribal Affairs, a branch of Government of India, looks after the affairs of the tribal communities in India by providing educational scholarships, grants to create more health infrastructure in tribal communities and direct cash transfer schemes to economically backward tribal families.

History
The ministry was set up in 1999 after the bifurcation of Ministry of Social Justice and Empowerment (India) to have a more focused approach on the integrated socio-economic development of the Scheduled Tribes (STs), the most underprivileged of the Indian Society. Before the formation of the ministry the tribal Affairs was being handled by different ministries which were:

As a Division of the Ministry of Home Affairs known as Tribal Division since after independence up to September 1985.
Ministry of Welfare: From September 1985 to May 1998.
Ministry of Social Justice & Empowerment from May 1998 to September 1999.

Functions of the Ministry 
Tribal Welfare-Planning, Policy formulation, Research and Training.
Tribal development including scholarships to STs.
Promotion of voluntary efforts in development of STs.
Administrative Ministry with respect to matters concerning Scheduled Areas.
The Ministry of Tribal Affairs is the Nodal Ministry for overall policy, planning and coordination of programmes of development for Scheduled Tribes.

Organisations 
Ministry has one Commission, One Public Sector Undertaking and one Co-operative Society under its administrative control, namely :
 National Commission for Scheduled Tribes (NCST) 
 National Scheduled Tribes Finance and Development Corporation (NSTFDC)
Tribal Co-operative Marketing Federation of India (TRIFED)

Ministers
The Minister of Tribal Affairs is the head of the Ministry of Tribal Affairs and one of the cabinet ministers of the Government of India.

List of Ministers of State

Initiatives

Van Dhan Samajik Doori Jagrookta Abhiyaan
Amidst the COVID-19 crisis in May 2020 the TRIFED, a cooperative body under Ministry of Tribal Affairs registered under Multi-State Co-operative Societies Act launched this scheme in order to educate the tribals in COVID related safety measures. Nationwide and state specific webinars were organised in order to bring awareness on the issue. The Ministry also revised Minimum Support Price (MSP) for Minor forest products (MFP) to be procured from the tribals under MSP for MFP scheme meanwhile promoting door to door procurement and sale through mobile vans. The program was launched in association with UNICEF.

Swasthya portal
Ministry of tribal affairs launched the Swasthya portal, which will act as one stop solution for matters related to health and nutrition status of the Scheduled Tribes. The Ministry's centre of excellence for knowledge management in health and nutrition will manage the portal and it will be hosted on National Informatics Centre cloud.

Going online as leaders program (GOAL)
The Ministry had partnered with Facebook to launch "GOAL" program which aims at training 5000 tribal youths through digital education in order to make them emerge as the village level digital young leaders of their community. The scheme includes distribution of mobile phones for the promotion of digital literacy and to narrow the digital divide among various section of population.

ALEKH
It is an e-newsletter launched by the Ministry in order to showcase the efforts of various stakeholders which are involved in improving the health and wellbeing of tribal population. It will be launched on quarterly basis.

See also 
 Eklavya Model Residential Schools, started by the Ministry
 Department of Adi Dravidar and Tribal Welfare (Tamil Nadu)

References

External links 
 Ministry of Tribal Affairs
 Department of Tribal Development of Maharashtra
 Department of Tribal Development of Madhya Pradesh
 Department of Tribal Development of Chhattisgarh
 Tribal Development Department, Himachal Pradesh

External links
 Official Website, Ministry of Tribal Affairs, Government of India

Ministry of Tribal Affairs
Tribal Affairs
India